The following are public holidays in Uruguay.

Only 5 of these holidays (January 1, May 1, July 18, August 25 and December 25) imply a mandatory paid leave for workers. Most of the other days are only observed by schools and some public sector offices.

Moveable holidays 
According to Uruguayan Law 16,805 with modifications of Law 17,414, the holidays declared by law, subject to the commemoration of them, follow the following scheme (whose commemoration as “moveable holidays”):
 If coincide on Saturday, Sunday or Monday will be observed in those days.
 If occur on Tuesday or Wednesday, will be observed on Monday immediately preceding.
 If occur on Thursday or Friday shall be observed on the Monday immediately following
This will not occur with Carnival and Tourism Week, and corresponding to January 1 and 6, May 1, June 19, July 18, August 25, November 2 and December 25, which will continue watching on the day of the week that may occur, whatever the same.

Independence Day

Historian Leonardo Borges argues that Independence Day, celebrated on August 25, does not reflect the actual birth of the nation. When the independence of the Brazilian Empire and the United Provinces of the Río de la Plata was signed on August 25, 1825, Uruguay remained part of Argentina, the Banda Oriental. Borges says that "[I]t seems like nonsense" to establish August 25 as Independence Day. Ana Ribeiro, Undersecretary of Education and Culture, argues that all such dates are arbitrary, and points out that Bastille Day does not celebrate the determining date of the French Revolution.

The Treaty of Montevideo, signed on August 27, 1828, and ratified on October 4 of the same year, after the Cisplatine War, granted independence to Banda Oriental, which became Uruguay.

References

External links

 
Uruguay
Holidays
Events in Uruguay